Mohammad Sarwashi (Arabic:محمد سرواشي; born 14 May 1999) is an Emirati footballer who plays as a left back.

Career

Al-Nasr
Sarwashi started his career at Al-Nasr and is a product of the Al-Nasr's youth system. On 16 March 2018, Sarwashi made his professional debut for Al-Nasr against Hatta in the Pro League.

Ajman
On 7 July 2020 left Al-Nasr and signed with Ajman on loan of season.

External links

References

1999 births
Living people
Emirati footballers
Al-Nasr SC (Dubai) players
Ajman Club players
UAE Pro League players
Association football fullbacks
Place of birth missing (living people)